The Hayward metric is the simplest description of a black hole which is non-singular. The metric was written down by Sean Hayward as the minimal model which is regular, static, spherically symmetric and asymptotically flat. The metric is not derived from any particular alternative theory of gravity, but provides a framework to test the formation and evaporation of non-singular black holes both within general relativity and beyond. Hayward first published his metric in 2005 and numerous papers have studied it since.

References

Theories of gravity
General relativity